The women's 4 × 100 metres relay event at the 1965 Summer Universiade was held at the People's Stadium in Budapest on 29 August 1965.

Results

References

Athletics at the 1965 Summer Universiade
1965